Vikrian Akbar Fathoni (born on 31 March 2000) is an Indonesian professional footballer who plays as a defensive midfielder for Liga 2 club PSKC Cimahi.

Club career

Arema FC
He made his professional debut in the Liga 1 on 16 December 2019, against Bali United where he played as a substitute.

Career statistics

Club

Notes

Honours

Club
Arema
 Indonesia President's Cup: 2019

References

External links
 Vikrian Akbar at Soccerway
 Vikrian Akbar at Liga Indonesia

2000 births
Living people
Indonesian footballers
Arema F.C. players
Association football midfielders
Sportspeople from Malang